William Douglas was a farmer, lumber merchant and political figure in New Brunswick, Canada. He represented Charlotte County in the Legislative Assembly of New Brunswick from 1886 to 1892 as a Conservative member.

He was born in Saint Andrews, New Brunswick and educated in Saint Stephen. In 1865, he married Sarah Eldridge. Douglas ran unsuccessfully for a seat in the provincial assembly in 1882. He served ten years as county councillor.

References 
The Canadian parliamentary companion, 1891 JA Gemmill

Year of birth missing
Year of death missing
Progressive Conservative Party of New Brunswick MLAs